Bryson James Aldrich DeChambeau (born September 16, 1993) is an American professional golfer who currently plays on the LIV Golf League. He has won eight times on the PGA Tour including one major championship, the 2020 U.S. Open. As an amateur, DeChambeau became the fifth player in history to win both the NCAA Division I championship and the U.S. Amateur in the same year. With his U.S. Open victory he became the third player to have won those three championships, after Jack Nicklaus and Tiger Woods, and the sixth player to win both the U.S. Amateur and U.S. Open.

Renowned for his analytical and scientific approaches to the sport, DeChambeau has acquired the nickname of "The Scientist". His clubs are specially designed to his specifications, with thicker than normal grips and irons that are all the same length. In 2020, he became the longest driver on the PGA Tour.

Early life, family and amateur career
DeChambeau was born on September 16, 1993, in Modesto, California to John Howard Aldrich DeChambeau and Janet Louise Druffel. He moved to Clovis, east of Fresno, at age seven. He attended Clovis East High School and won the California State Junior Championship at age 16 in 2010. He graduated in 2012 and accepted a scholarship to Southern Methodist University in Dallas, Texas, majoring in physics.

In June 2015, DeChambeau became the first SMU Mustang to win the NCAA individual championship, recording a score of 280 (−8) to win by one stroke. In August, he won the U.S. Amateur title, defeating Derek Bard 7 & 6 in the 36-hole final. He became the fifth player to win both the NCAA and U.S. Amateur titles in the same year, joining Jack Nicklaus (1961), Phil Mickelson (1990), Tiger Woods (1996), and Ryan Moore (2004).

DeChambeau made his PGA Tour debut as an amateur in June 2015 at the FedEx St. Jude Classic near Memphis, Tennessee, and finished in 45th place. He played in his first major championship at the U.S. Open at Chambers Bay, but missed the cut by four strokes. DeChambeau was unable to defend his NCAA title in 2016 after the SMU athletic department was handed a postseason ban by the NCAA. He decided to forgo his senior season to play in a number of events before turning professional. At the 2015 Australian Masters in November, DeChambeau was runner-up with John Senden and Andrew Evans, two shots behind the winner Peter Senior. He was the low amateur at the Masters in 2016 and tied for 21st place.

Professional career
Immediately after the Masters in mid-April 2016, DeChambeau turned professional and signed a long-term agreement with Cobra-Puma Golf. He made his pro debut days later at the RBC Heritage in South Carolina and tied for fourth, earning over $259,000. The decision to turn professional meant the forfeiture of his exemptions to the U.S. Open at Oakmont and Open Championship at Royal Troon but qualified his way into the U.S. Open, tied for 15th place to earn over $152,000, and improved his world ranking to 148. Despite the strong start, DeChambeau did not earn enough non-member FedEx Cup points that season to qualify for a 2017 PGA Tour card but did qualify for the Web.com Tour Finals. He was successful at earning his card through the Finals, due to a win at the DAP Championship. 

On July 16, 2017, DeChambeau earned his first PGA Tour victory by winning the John Deere Classic by a single stroke over Patrick Rodgers. He carded a round of 65 in the final round to win his maiden title in his 40th start on tour. The win coming the week before, gained DeChambeau a place in the 2017 Open Championship, where he missed the cut after rounds of 76–77 (+13). In 2017, he gifted U.S. President Donald Trump golf clubs valued at $750.

On June 3, 2018, DeChambeau won the Memorial Tournament in Dublin, Ohio, in a sudden-death playoff against Kyle Stanley and An Byeong-hun, after the three finished regulation play tied at −15. After Stanley bogeyed the first hole of sudden death, DeChambeau proceeded to win with a birdie on the second hole, giving him his second victory on the tour. On August 26, 2018, he won The Northern Trust for his first playoff victory and, in the process, established a new record for the tournament when held at the Ridgewood Country Club – with a score of 266 – besting the old Ridgewood record of 270, which was set in 2014 by Hunter Mahan. The following week, he won at the Dell Technologies Championship played at TPC Boston in Norton, Massachusetts, with a final score of −16, two shots clear of Justin Rose. This put him over 2000 points ahead of second place player Dustin Johnson in the FedEx Cup rankings. This margin secured him top seeding at The Tour Championship, regardless of his finish at the BMW Championship. This also marked his fourth win on the tour, third for the year, and second in a FedEx Cup playoff event. At the Tour Championship, DeChambeau finished 19th out of 30 participants. As a result, he fell to 3rd in the FedEx Cup, winning $2,000,000. In September 2018, DeChambeau was named as a captain's pick by Jim Furyk for the United States team participating in the 2018 Ryder Cup. Europe defeated the U.S. team, 17½ points to 10½ points. DeChambeau went 0–3–0. He lost his singles match against Alex Norén.

On November 4, 2018, DeChambeau won the Shriners Hospitals for Children Open in Las Vegas, Nevada. The win was worth $1,260,000 in prize money. The win brought him to number five in the Official World Golf Ranking. On January 27, 2019, DeChambeau won the Omega Dubai Desert Classic in Dubai, UAE. DeChambeau claimed his maiden European Tour title by producing a closing 64 to win the tournament by seven shots. In December 2019, DeChambeau played on the U.S. team at the 2019 Presidents Cup at Royal Melbourne Golf Club in Australia. The U.S. team won 16–14. DeChambeau went 0–1–1 and halved his Sunday singles match against Adam Hadwin.

Beginning in late 2019, DeChambeau set out to add muscle mass in order to increase his swing speed and hit the ball farther. He added 20 pounds before the tour's break due to the COVID-19 pandemic and another 20 during the break. When the tour resumed, he quickly moved to the lead in driving distance. On July 5, 2020, DeChambeau won the Rocket Mortgage Classic in Detroit, Michigan, by three strokes over Matthew Wolff. In the final round, DeChambeau shot a 7-under 65 at Detroit Golf Club, birdieing four of the first seven holes and closing with three consecutive birdies. He finished at a career-best 23-under 265. DeChambeau came into the week with six straight top-eight finishes and was the only player with top-10s in the first three events after the restart from the coronavirus.

In August 2020, DeChambeau briefly held a share of the lead during the final round of the PGA Championship; he went on to finish in a tie for fourth place, his first top-10 finish in a major championship. Six weeks later, at the 120th U.S. Open at Winged Foot, he came from two strokes behind at the start of the final round to win his first major championship. His six-under par total gave him a six stroke victory over Matthew Wolff. He was the only player under par in the final round, with a three-under par 67 and the only player to finish under par for the tournament. With the win, he became the third player in history, after Jack Nicklaus and Tiger Woods, to win the NCAA Individual Championship, the U.S. Amateur and the U.S. Open during a career. The win moved him to number five in the Official World Golf Ranking, matching his previous best, which he had first achieved in November 2018.

In March 2021, DeChambeau won the Arnold Palmer Invitational at Bay Hill Club & Lodge in Orlando, Florida. He shot a final round one-under 71 to defeat Lee Westwood by one shot.

After shooting an opening round 1-over 71 at the 2021 Open Championship, DeChambeau placed blame on his driver, saying after the round, "That's what I said a couple of days ago; if I can hit it down the middle of the fairway, that's great, but with the driver right now, the driver sucks". That comment drew the ire of Ben Schomin, a tour operations manager for Cobra Golf who caddied for DeChambeau at the Rocket Mortgage Classic two weeks prior. Schomin told Golfweek, "It's just really, really painful when he says something that stupid. He has never really been happy, ever. Like, it's very rare when he's happy". DeChambeau would later issue an apology on Instagram.

In August 2021, DeChambeau shot 27 under-par at the BMW Championship in Owings Mills, Maryland, but lost on the sixth hole of a sudden-death playoff to Patrick Cantlay.

In September 2021, DeChambeau played on the U.S. team in the 2021 Ryder Cup at Whistling Straits in Kohler, Wisconsin. The U.S. team won 19–9 and Dechambeau went 2–0–1 and won his Sunday singles match against Sergio García.

In April 2022, DeChambeau announced that he had surgery on his left wrist and would be taking the appropriate time to rest and recover.

Joining LIV Golf 
In February 2022, amid speculation that he was joining the Saudi-backed LIV Golf tour, DeChambeau released a statement committing to the PGA Tour. After missing the cut in the Memorial Tournament, DeChambeau was again asked about LIV Golf, in which his answer suggested he would continue with the PGA Tour. However, on June 8, The Daily Telegraph reported that DeChambeau would be joining LIV Golf. On June 10, LIV Golf confirmed that DeChambeau had joined the tour. 

As a result of joining LIV Golf, Rocket Mortgage ended its sponsorship deal with DeChambeau. 911familiesunited.org, a coalition of families and survivors of the 2001 terrorist attacks, sent a scathing letter to representatives of DeChambeau as well as other LIV Golf members, expressing their outrage toward the golfers for participating in LIV Golf and accusing them of sportswashing and betraying the United States.

Interactions with rules officials
DeChambeau has been involved in several widely reported interactions with rules officials. In the second round of the 2020 Memorial Tournament, DeChambeau's second shot at the 15th went under a fence and was apparently out of bounds. He attempted to argue that only part of the ball was out of bounds, and he should be allowed to play it, but PGA Tour rules official Ken Tackett ruled against him. DeChambeau asked for a ruling from a second official, who confirmed Tackett's ruling as correct. He went on to shoot a quintuple-bogey 10 on the hole, and missed the cut.

Just two weeks later at the WGC-FedEx St. Jude Invitational, DeChambeau's tee shot at the 7th stopped on top of some small sticks near the base of a tree. He attempted to argue that there were "red ants" in the immediate area of the ball, and asked for a free drop under the rule that allows a drop "when a dangerous animal (such as poisonous snakes, stinging bees, alligators, a single hornet, fire ants or bears) near a ball could cause serious physical injury to the player". He spent nearly three minutes attempting to convince the official (by coincidence, Tackett again), but ultimately had to play the ball as it lay. He finished the hole with a double-bogey 6. Brooks Koepka later poked fun at DeChambeau, faking as though he was summoning a rules official in response to an ant infestation.

Unique clubs
All of DeChambeau's irons and wedges are cut to exactly the same length: . Their lie and bounce angles are also the same; only the lofts are different. In addition to the single-length concept, his clubs are unusual for their extremely upright lie angle. He also uses custom-made carbon graphite shafts on all of his clubs, including his putter. He is a first to do so among PGA Tour players. DeChambeau keeps the club on the same plane throughout his swing and does not turn his wrists during his swing. In 2011, at the suggestion of his instructor Mike Schy, DeChambeau switched to JumboMax Grips, the largest grips commercially available, which allow him to hold the club in his palms rather than his fingers.

DeChambeau is known for very long drives, and has experimented with a longer-than-usual 48-inch driver. Partly in response, the R&A and USGA, which jointly determine the rules of golf, to avoid troublesome issues with the effect of club length on distances, instituted a local rule from 2022 to allow competition organisers to limit the permitted length of a non-putter golf club to 46 inches. DeChambeau later said that the 48-inch driver had not worked for him.

Personal life

Comments on the COVID-19 vaccine

DeChambeau withdrew from the 2020 Summer Olympics after testing positive for COVID-19. When asked about it before the start of the WGC-FedEx St. Jude Invitational, DeChambeau said he wasn't vaccinated and "the vaccine doesn't necessarily prevent it from happening. I'm young enough, I'd rather give it [the vaccine] to people who need it. I don't need it. I'm a healthy, young individual that will continue to work on my health. I don't think taking the vaccine away from someone who needs it is a good thing. My dad is a perfect example. He got it [the vaccine] early on because he's a diabetic. People like that need to get it. My mom got it. I don't want to take away that ability". DeChambeau also added, "Now as time goes on, if it [the vaccine] is mainstream, really, really mainstream, then yeah".

Ties with the Trump family
In December 2017, DeChambeau played a round of golf with then-U.S. President Donald Trump along with then-senator David Perdue, and Dana Quigley. DeChambeau had also gifted Trump a set of golf clubs that year valued at $750. DeChambeau said in a 2020 interview, "I am extremely honored to represent Trump Golf and have the relationship with the Trump Organization that I have. From Larry Glick, to Eric Trump and Donald Trump Jr., the entire team is always behind me 100%, and I am grateful for their support. After winning the 2020 U.S. Open, DeChambeau celebrated his victory at Trump National Golf Club Westchester with Eric Trump. 

After the 2021 United States Capitol attack and the PGA of America's decision to remove the 2022 PGA Championship from Trump National Golf Club Bedminster, DeChambeau had the Trump logo removed from his bag. He said, "I know there's a lot of stuff going on today and I won't really talk too much about relationships or anything like that. It's unfortunate and it is what it is and I understand it. At the end of the day, whatever [the PGA of America’s] moves are, they are. I really don't have a comment. I'm still going to go play a golf course and try to do my best no matter where it is". DeChambeau played a round of golf with Donald Trump two months later.

Amateur wins
2010 California State Junior Championship
2013 Trans-Mississippi Amateur
2014 The American Championship, Erin Hills Intercollegiate
2015 NCAA Division I Championship, U.S. Amateur

Source:

Professional wins (10)

PGA Tour wins (8)

PGA Tour playoff record (1–1)

European Tour wins (2)

Web.com Tour wins (1)

Web.com Tour playoff record (1–0)

Major championships

Wins (1)

Results timeline
Results not in chronological order in 2020.

LA = Low amateur
CUT = missed the half-way cut
"T" = tied
NT = No tournament due to COVID-19 pandemic

Summary

Most consecutive cuts made – 7 (2020 PGA – 2021 Open Championship)
Longest streak of top-10s – 2 (2020 PGA – 2020 U.S. Open)

Results in The Players Championship

"T" indicates a tie for a place
C = Canceled after the first round due to the COVID-19 pandemic

Results in World Golf Championships

1Cancelled due to COVID-19 pandemic

NT = No tournament
"T" = Tied
Note that the Championship and Invitational were discontinued from 2022.

U.S. national team appearances
Amateur
Palmer Cup: 2014
Eisenhower Trophy: 2014 (winners)
Walker Cup: 2015

Professional
Ryder Cup: 2018, 2021 (winners)
Presidents Cup: 2019 (winners)

See also
2016 Web.com Tour Finals graduates

Notes

References

External links
 
SMU Mustangs – profile

American male golfers
PGA Tour golfers
LIV Golf players
Winners of men's major golf championships
Ryder Cup competitors for the United States
SMU Mustangs men's golfers
Korn Ferry Tour graduates
Golfers from California
Sportspeople from Modesto, California
Sportspeople from Clovis, California
1993 births
Living people